John R. Hornaman (born February 13, 1947) is a former Democratic member of the Pennsylvania House of Representatives, representing the 3rd District from 2007 through 2013.

Hornaman attended McDowell High School and earned a degree in economics from Gannon University Prior to elective he worked as an agent for New York Life from 1972 through 1976. He also owned a painting contracting business, Creative Wall Finishes, for 30 years. He served as a citizen advisor on the Act 101 Solid Waste Committee of Erie County from 2005 to 2006. Hornaman has also been a strong advocate for Lake Erie Wind Power.

References

External links
 Pennsylvania House of Representatives - John Hornaman  official PA House website
Pennsylvania House Democratic Caucus - Rep. John R. Hornaman official Party website

Follow the Money - John Hornaman
2006 campaign contributions

1947 births
Living people
Members of the Pennsylvania House of Representatives
Politicians from Erie, Pennsylvania
United States Army officers
Gannon University alumni
21st-century American politicians
Military personnel from Pennsylvania